The hypsometric equation, also known as the thickness equation, relates an atmospheric pressure ratio to the equivalent thickness of an atmospheric layer considering the layer mean of virtual temperature, gravity, and occasionally wind. It is derived from the hydrostatic equation and the ideal gas law.

Formulation
The hypsometric equation is expressed as:

where:
 = thickness of the layer  [m],
 = geometric height [m],
 = specific gas constant for dry air,
 = mean virtual temperature in Kelvin [K],
 = gravitational acceleration [m/s2],
 = pressure [Pa].

In radiosonde observation, the hypsometric equation can be used to compute the height of a pressure level given the height of a reference pressure level and the mean virtual temperature in between. Then, the newly computed height can be used as a new reference level to compute the height of the next level given the mean virtual temperature in between, and so on.

Derivation 

The hydrostatic equation:

where  is the density [kg/m3], is used to generate the equation for hydrostatic equilibrium, written in differential form:

This is combined with the ideal gas law: 

 

to eliminate :

R and g are constant with z, so they can be brought outside the integral.
If temperature varies linearly with z (e.g., given a small change in z),

Integration gives

simplifying to

Rearranging:

or, eliminating the natural log:

Correction 
The Eötvös effect can be taken into account as a correction to the hypsometric equation. Physically, using a frame of reference that rotates with Earth, an air mass moving eastward effectively weighs less, which corresponds to an increase in thickness between pressure levels, and vice versa. The corrected hypsometric equation follows:

where the correction due to the Eötvös effect, A, can be expressed as follows:

where
 = Earth rotation rate,
 = latitude,
 = distance from Earth center to the air mass,
 = mean velocity in longitudinal direction (east-west), and
 = mean velocity in latitudinal direction (north-south).

This correction is considerable in tropical large-scale atmospheric motion.

See also
Barometric formula
Vertical pressure variation

References

Equations
Fluid mechanics
Pressure
Temperature
Atmospheric thermodynamics
Vertical position